Diamonds in a Dead Sky is The Missionary Position's debut album, released August 11, 2009 on the label "Boredom Killing Business." It features songs written by Jeff Angell and Benjamin Anderson.

Diamonds in a Dead Sky was recorded in Seattle, Washington

Track listing
"All My Mistakes"
"Let's Start a Fire"
"Here Comes the Machine"
"So Close"
"The Big Sleep"
"Where the Wild Winds Blow"
"Anywhere"
"Why Me, Why Now?"
"When I Get My Hands On You"

Credits 
Jeff Angell - Vocals, Guitars, Bass Programming, Beatbox
Benjamin Anderson - Piano, Key Bass, Organ, Synths, Programming, Backing Vocals

Additional musicians

Kenny James - Drums, Percussion, French Horn, Backing Vocals
Nabil Ayers (The Long Winters, The Control Group)- Drums on "So Close"
Gregor Lothian - Saxophone
McKinley: Alto Saxophone on "Why Me, Why Now?"
Matthew Postle - Trumpet
Jeff Rouse (Loaded, Alien Crime Syndicate) - Backing Vocals
Isaac Carpenter (Loudermilk, Gosling, Loaded)- Backing Vocals
Najamoniq Todd - Backing Vocals
Recorded by Benjamin Anderson, in Seattle, Washington.
Mixed by Isaac Carpenter at MILKMAN Studios in Los Angeles.  Additional mixing by Aaron Cramer
Mastered by Brad Blackwood at Euphonic Masters in Memphis, Tennessee.

External links 

  Official Missionary Position Band
  The Boredom Killing Business
  The Missionary Position Diamonds in a Dead Sky one sheet

References

Credits at Allmusic.com

2009 debut albums
The Missionary Position (band) albums